Newly created taxonomic names in biological nomenclature often reflect the discoverer's interests or honour those the discoverer holds in esteem. This is a list of real organisms with scientific names chosen to reference works of fiction.

Literature

Greek mythology

William Shakespeare

Don Quixote

Robinson Crusoe

Gulliver's Travels

Victor Hugo

Moby-Dick

Lewis Carroll

Mark Twain

The Adventures of Pinocchio

Arthur Conan Doyle

Rudyard Kipling

Dracula

Peter Pan

H. P. Lovecraft

Winnie-the-Pooh

Vladimir Nabokov

J. R. R. Tolkien

Enid Blyton

Dune

Aubrey–Maturin series

The Hitchhiker's Guide to the Galaxy

Discworld

The Witcher

A Song of Ice and Fire

Harry Potter

Rumo and His Miraculous Adventure

Ready Player One

Other literature

Comics

The Adventures of Tintin

Asterix

DC Comics

Marvel Comics

Peanuts

Calvin and Hobbes

Other comics

Films

Disney and Pixar

Looney Tunes

Godzilla

Star Wars

Alien

The Terminator

Crocodile Dundee

The Fifth Element

The Big Lebowski

Avatar

Other films

Television

Doctor Who

Star Trek

Sesame Street and The Muppets

SpongeBob SquarePants

Battlestar Galactica

Dungeons & Dragons

The Big Bang Theory

Other television series

Games

Galaga

Super Mario

The Legend of Zelda

Street Fighter

Pokémon

Bioshock

Other games

See also 
 List of unusual biological names
 List of organisms named after famous people

References 

Fiction